Timothy O'Reilly (born 6 June 1954) is an Irish-American author and publisher, who is the founder of O'Reilly Media (formerly O'Reilly & Associates). He popularised the terms open source and Web 2.0.

Education and early life
Born in County Cork, Ireland, Tim O'Reilly moved to San Francisco, California, with his family when he was a baby. He has three brothers and three sisters. As a teenager, encouraged by his older brother Sean, O'Reilly became a follower of George Simon, a writer and adherent of the general semantics program. Through Simon, O'Reilly became acquainted with the work of Alfred Korzybski, which he has cited as a formative experience.

In 1973, O'Reilly enrolled at Harvard College to study classics and graduated cum laude with a Bachelor of Arts degree in 1975. During O'Reilly's first year at Harvard, George Simon died in an accident.

Career
After graduating, O'Reilly completed an edition of Simon's Notebooks, 1965–1973. He also wrote a well-received book on the science fiction writer Frank Herbert and edited a collection of Herbert's essays and interviews. 
O'Reilly got started as a technical writer in 1977. He started publishing computer manuals in 1983, setting up his business in a converted barn in Newton, Massachusetts, where about a dozen employees worked in a single open room. In 1989, O'Reilly moved his company to Sebastopol, California, and published the Whole Internet User's Guide and Catalog, which was a best-seller in 1992. O'Reilly's business, then known as O'Reilly & Associates, steadily grew through the 1990s, during which period it expanded from paper printed materials to web publishing. In 1993, the company's catalogue became an early web portal, the Global Network Navigator, which in 1995 was sold to America Online.

The company suffered in the dotcom crash of 2000. As book sales decreased, O'Reilly had to lay off about seventy people, about a quarter of the staff, but thereafter rebuilt the company around ebook publishing and event production. In 2011 O'Reilly handed over the reins of O'Reilly Media to the company's CFO, Laura Baldwin, but retained the title of CEO in recognition for the indispensable role he had in building the O'Reilly Media company and brand.

O'Reilly serves on the board of directors of three companies: Safari Books Online, Maker Media, and PeerJ. He served on the board of Macromedia until its 2005 merger with Adobe Systems, and on the board of MySQL AB until its sale to Sun Microsystems. He also serves on the board of directors for Code for America. In February 2012, he joined the UC Berkeley School of Information Advisory Board. As a venture capitalist, O'Reilly has invested in companies such as Fastly, Blogger, Delicious, Foursquare, Bitly, and Chumby.

In 2017, O'Reilly's book WTF? What's the Future and Why It's Up to Us was published, in which he discusses the consequences of technology and its potential to enhance the human experience.

Advocacy

O'Reilly has worked as an activist for a number of causes and prides himself on his company's "long history of advocacy, meme-making, and evangelism." As a strategy of persuasion, he has evolved a technique of "meme engineering," which seeks to modify the terminology that people use.

Early causes
In 1996, O'Reilly fought against a 10-Connection Limit on TCP/IP NT Workstations, writing a letter to the United States Department of Justice, Bill Gates, and CNN, concerned that the Internet was still in its infancy, and that limitations could cripple the technology before it ever had a chance to reach its full potential. In 2001, O'Reilly was involved in a dispute with Amazon.com, against Amazon's one-click patent and, specifically, Amazon's assertion of that patent against rival Barnes & Noble. The protest ended with O'Reilly and Amazon.com founder Jeff Bezos visiting Washington D.C. to lobby for patent reform.

Open source software
In 1998, O'Reilly helped rebrand free software under the term open source. O'Reilly sees the role of open source as being inseparable from the development of the Internet, pointing to the widely used TCP/IP protocol, sendmail, Apache, Perl, Linux and other open source platforms. He is concerned about trends towards new forms of lock-in.

Web 2.0
In 2003, after the dot com bust, O'Reilly Media's corporate goal was to reignite enthusiasm in the computer industry. Dale Dougherty, an executive at O'Reilly, invoked the phrase "Web 2.0" during a brainstorming session. Though O'Reilly is often credited with popularizing the phrase Web 2.0, it originated with Darcy DiNucci, who coined the term in 1999. O'Reilly went on to popularize the phrase as a handle for the resurgence of the web after the dotcom crash of 2000, and as a generic term for the "harnessing of collective intelligence" viewed as the hallmark of this resurgence. O'Reilly first called an "executive conference" in 2004, inviting five hundred technology and business leaders, followed by a public version of the event in 2005. Annual iterations of the event, known as the "Web 2.0 Summit" from 2006 onwards, continued until 2011.

O'Reilly and employees of O'Reilly Media have applied the "2.0" concept to conferences in publishing and government, amongst other things. O'Reilly envisions the Internet Operating System as consisting of various sub systems, such as media, payment, speech recognition, location, and identity. He uses the analogy of the biome of the human body having more bacterial than human cells (a ratio lately estimated at 1.3:1), but depending upon millions of other organisms each pursuing their own interest but nevertheless weaving a co-operative web.

Government as platform
O'Reilly has been propagating the notion of "government as platform", or "Gov 2.0". He is considered the most enthusiastic promoter of algorithmic regulation, the ongoing monitoring and modification of government policies via open data feedback.

Inner source 
In 2001, O'Reilly coined the term inner source for the use of open source software development practices and the establishment of an open source-like culture within organisations whereby the organisation may still develop proprietary software but internally opens up its development.

Personal life
After graduating from Harvard, O'Reilly married his first wife, Christina, with whom he moved to the Boston area. The couple raised two daughters, Arwen and Meara. Arwen is married to Saul Griffith.

On 11 April 2015 O'Reilly married Jennifer Pahlka, a former Deputy CTO of the US, and Founder and former Executive Director of Code for America.

See also
Algorithmic regulation
Infoware
Web 2.0
O'Reilly Media
Make
Foo Camp
Inner source

References

External links 

 FUTURIST magazine interview with O'Reilly, Re: Future of Publishing
 NerdTV Interview (video, audio, and transcript available) – 29 September 2005
 Tim O'Reilly interview – O'Reilly on Linux PC Pro interview covering Linux, Java and books
 Tim O'Reilly talks about Govt 2.0 at Aspen Ideas Festival, July 2009 video
 Tim O'Reilly on FLOSS Weekly
 Speaking with Stewart Brand and The Long Now on the subject “Birth of the Global Mind” (020130905)
 
 

1954 births
Living people
American technology writers
People from County Cork
Harvard College alumni
People from Sebastopol, California
Irish emigrants to the United States
Open content activists
Irish computer programmers
Perl people
Open source advocates